Nina Grunenberg (7 October 1936 – 28 December 2017) was a German author and prize-winning journalist. Beginning her career in West Germany at a time when political journalism was largely a male preserve, she wrote carefully researched reports on life in that country, and its political, social and economic topics, and focusing frequently on science or education (her husband, Reimar Lüst, was an astrophysicist.)  She wrote about leaders in industry, unions and politics.

Biography

Provenance and early years 
Caroline “Nina” Grunenberg was born in Dresden, where she attended school between 1942 and 1950.    She was eight and a half when the World War II ended. From 1950 to 1954 she was a pupil at the “Ursulinen-Gymnasium” (catholic secondary school) in Cologne. After high school she began a three year apprenticeship in the book trade in 1954.

Journalist 
From 1958 to 1965 Grunenberg worked as a freelance journalist. Cologne was becoming the West German television capital during this period, and one of the organisations she worked for was the Westdeutscher Rundfunk broadcasting organisation. She also contributed frequently to the Hamburg-based weekly newspaper, Die Zeit, of which editorial staff she joined in 1961, 1965 or 1969 (sources differ). From 1965 to 1969 she was the paper’s “Länderspiegelkorrespondentin”, working on the regional supplement produced by the newspaper for readers in the state of North Rhine-Westphalia. According to a “laudatio” commendation piece published. many years later to celebrate Grunenberg’s “lifetime achievements”, while based at the Cologne office she worked on the “Länderspiegel” supplement.     

She was based at the Die Zeit'''s main office in Hamburg from 1969 as an editor for education and universities policy. From 1974 to 1984 she was listed as the paper's “political reporter”. She was based in Paris between 1984 and 1987. From 1987 to 1995 she was deputy editor-in-chief of Die Zeit.

 Reimar Lüst 
In 1986 Nina Grunenberg married, as his second wife, the astrophysicist Prof. Dr. Dieter Lüst (1923–2020), the President of the Max Planck Society from 1972 to 1984 and a pioneer of space research.   Through the marriage, Grunenberg acquired two adult stepsons.

 Later career 
In 1992  Die Zeit set up a new section under the name “the Knowledge Department” (”das Ressort Wissen”'').    Grunenberg was assigned to head it, which she did along with her other responsibilities at the newspaper until 1994. By this time she had established a specialty as an educational journalist.

Between 2000 and 2009 she was a member of the government’s 32-member  German Science and Humanities Council, the first journalist to be a member. After 2009 she continued to work for the council on a consultancy basis.

Grunenberg was also a member of the PEN Centre Germany.

Death 

Grunenberg died at Hamburg-Ohlsdorf on 28 December 2017.

A (selection) 
• 1964: Kurt Magnus Prize from the ARD

• 1973: Theodor Wolff Prize of the Newspaper Publishers’ Association

• 1990: Herbert Quandt Media Prize of the Johanna-Quandt Foundation.

• 2009: Theodor Wolff Prize of the Newspaper Publishers’ Association: for her life’s work

References 

1936 births
2017 deaths
German newspaper journalists
German opinion journalists
German women non-fiction writers
20th-century German non-fiction writers
21st-century German non-fiction writers
Die Zeit people
People from Dresden
Writers from Hamburg